Donald Bradford Beary (4 December 1888 – 7 March 1966) was a vice admiral of the United States Navy. His career included service in both World War I and World War II and a tour as President of the Naval War College. He commanded a wide variety of ships and organizations, and is particularly noted for his leadership during World War II in establishing and directing a large-scale U.S. Navy training program and for his pioneering and highly successful work as a commander of U.S. Navy underway replenishment forces.

Naval career

Beary was born on 4 December 1888 in Helena, Montana. He entered the United States Naval Academy in Annapolis, Maryland, in 1906 and graduated in 1910. His first assignments were aboard three armored cruisers,  from 1910 to 1911,  from 1912 to 1914, and  during 1914. He then attended Columbia University in New York, New York, from 1915 to 1917, and received a Master of Science degree in electrical engineering from the university in 1917.

World War I
After the United States entered World War I on 6 April 1917, Beary served in the Atlantic on convoy duty and in antisubmarine warfare against German submarines, commanding the armed yacht  from 1917 to 1918 and then the destroyer  in 1918. He received the Navy Cross in 1918 for distinguished service as commanding officer of Remlik and Lamson in the Atlantic campaign.

Interwar
A lieutenant commander by the end of World War I, Bearys first post-war assignment was duty at the U.S. Navy Bureau of Navigation from 1919 to 1921. From 1923 to 1924 he served ashore at the United States Department of the Navy in Washington, D.C., in the Division of Fleet Training, Navy Operations. He then returned to sea with duty aboard the battleship  from 1925 to 1927, seeing service in the Second Nicaraguan Campaign.

From 1928 to 1930, Beary taught at the United States Naval Academy. He then served on the staff of the Commander-in-Chief, United States Asiatic Fleet, from 1931 to 1934, seeing service on the Yangtze Patrol. From 1934 to 1935, he was assigned to duty with the Chief of Naval Operations in Washington, D.C. He then served on the staff of the Naval War College in Newport, Rhode Island, in 1936.

Beary went back to sea in 1937 as executive officer of the battleship , serving aboard her until 1938, when he was promoted to captain. He then was commanding officer of the light cruiser  from 1938 to 1939 before returning to duty at the United States Naval Academy, serving a second tour as an instructor there from 1939 until 1941. On 1 October 1941, he became commanding officer of both the troop transport  and Transport Division 19.

World War II

Mount Vernon was in the Atlantic Ocean as part of a convoy steaming from Halifax, Nova Scotia, Canada, bound for Cape Town, South Africa, when the Japanese attack on Pearl Harbor, Hawaii, brought the United States into World War II on 7 December 1941. She proceeded via the Cape of Good Hope and the Indian Ocean to Singapore, arriving there on 13 January 1942. In port until 16 January 1942, she landed desperately needed reinforcements and evacuated refugees despite frequent Japanese air raids, herself coming under air attack. She then operated in the Indian Ocean and Southwest Pacific until March 1942 to move additional reinforcements from the Middle East to Southeast Asia and evacuate refugees from Australia. Beary received the Bronze Star Medal in 1943 for meritorious achievement in these operations, and was especially cited for his conspicuous professional ability, leadership, and organization during Mount Vernons stay in Singapore.

In July 1942, Beary became Commandant of Naval Operations Base Iceland. On 10 February 1943 he was promoted to rear admiral and took command of the United States Atlantic Fleets Fleet Operational Training Command, which organized and trained ships crews, upon its establishment on 14 March 1943. As its commanding officer, he oversaw the creation and operation of a number of navy training establishments along the United States East Coast, at Naval Station Guantanamo Bay, Cuba, and on Culebra Island off Puerto Rico, including a number of Anti-Aircraft Training Centers; the Anti-Aircraft Training Afloat Program aboard the antiaircraft training ship ; the Combat Information Center Group Training Center in Norfolk, Virginia; the Anti-Submarine Warfare Unit in Norfolk; the Fleet Sonar School in Key West, Florida, and the Minecraft Training Center at Little Creek, Virginia. In all, he directed the training of more than a million officers and men and supervised the shakedown or refresher training of about 5,000 ships and craft. He received the Distinguished Service Medal in February 1945 for this service.

On 1 October 1944, Beary took command of Service Squadron 6, a revolutionary new mobile underway replenishment element of the Service Force, United States Pacific Fleet, dedicated to support of the U.S. Third and Fifth Fleets in the Pacific. He proved particularly gifted in maintaining logistic support to the fleet despite the vast distances involved in the Pacific Theater and the complex and demanding task of keeping the fleets' combat forces supplied while underway for their frequent operations, including during the Battles of Iwo Jima and Okinawa. His achievements in Service Squadron 6 were recognized by two awards of the Legion of Merit, both in 1945, for exceptional and meritorious conduct.

During the ceremony in which Japan surrendered to the Allies on board the battleship  on 2 September 1945 to end World War II, Beary served as a dignitary on the staff of United States Army General of the Army Douglas MacArthur.

Post-World War II
After World War II, Beary held various commands, serving as administrator of the U.S. Naval Shipping Control Authority; commandant of the 12th Naval District in 1946; commander of Naval Base San Francisco; commander of Western Sea Frontier; and commander of Pacific Reserve Fleet.

On 1 November 1948, having reached the rank of vice admiral, Beary returned to the Naval War College as its president. During his presidency, he sought to broaden the views of students by bringing business authorities and leaders to meet with them in roundtable discussions, laying the groundwork for the college's Global Strategy Discussions of the 1950s and Current Strategy Forum of today.

Beary remained the war college's president until 28 May 1950. He retired from the navy on 1 October 1950.

Personal life
Beary was married to Alice L. Beary (1889-1953). They had one daughter, Alice B. Beary Meschter (1920-2006).

Beary was a decorated marksman and a member of the Navy Gun Club.

Death
Beary died on 7 March 1966 at the U.S. Naval Hospital in San Diego, California. He was interred alongside his wife at the United States Naval Academy Cemetery and Columbarium with full military honors.

Namesake

The U.S. Navy destroyer escort (later frigate)  (later FF-1085), in commission from 1972 to 1994, was named in Bearys honor.

Awards
 Navy Cross
 Distinguished Service Medal
 Legion of Merit (two awards, one with Combat "V")
 Bronze Star Medal
 World War I Victory Medal
 Second Nicaraguan Campaign Medal
 Yangtze Service Medal
 American Defense Service Medal (with Atlantic Device)
 American Campaign Medal
 European–African–Middle Eastern Campaign Medal
 Asiatic–Pacific Campaign Medal
 World War II Victory Medal
 Distinguished Marksmanship and Pistol Shot Ribbon

Notes

References
 Britain At War: Convoy William Sail 12X
 Dictionary of American Naval Fighting Ships: Mount Vernon - IV
 
 Past Presidents page at the Naval War College official Web site
 Navsource Online: Destroyer Escort Photo Archive: USS Donald B. Beary (DE 1085)
 togetherweserved.com VADM Donald Beary

External links 

Past Presidents of the Naval War College
Photo at Find-A-Grave of Donald B. Beary and of the headstone of Donald B. Beary and Alice L. Beary

1888 births
1966 deaths
People from Helena, Montana
United States Navy personnel of World War I
United States Navy World War II admirals
Presidents of the Naval War College
United States Navy vice admirals
United States Naval Academy alumni
Naval War College faculty
Columbia School of Engineering and Applied Science alumni
United States Naval Academy faculty
United States Distinguished Marksman
Recipients of the Navy Distinguished Service Medal
Recipients of the Legion of Merit
Recipients of the Navy Cross (United States)
Burials at the United States Naval Academy Cemetery
20th-century American academics